The Northshore is a mixed-use building in Austin, Texas that includes 439 residential units and 40,000 square feet of retail and office space.  Co-Working company Galvanize occupies the office space in the building. Greystar manages the 439 residential units. As of 2019, the tower stands as the 9th tallest building in Austin, Texas. The building is the tallest apartment building in the city. The Northshore is part of the redevelopment of the former Green Water Treatment Plant site in downtown Austin.

The tower was originally planned to have a twin on neighboring Block 185, but the plan was reduced in scope to the single tower on Block 1 in 2014. Block 185 began construction in 2019, as a different design.

See also
List of tallest buildings in Austin, Texas
List of tallest buildings in Texas
List of tallest buildings in the United States

References

External links
 Main website

 * 

Residential skyscrapers in Austin, Texas
Residential buildings completed in 2016
Gensler buildings